Rui Manuel Monteiro Silva ComIH (born 3 August 1977) is a Portuguese track and field athlete and coach who represents S.L. Benfica. As a distance runner, he specializes at the 1500 and 3000 m events, although he has at times run the 800 metres as well. Silva is the current national champion at 1500 m.

Biography
Silva was the Olympic bronze medalist at Athens in 2004, where he went from last place to third place in less than 400 meters, his last lap being in 51.3 seconds. His last 800 meters of that race were run in 1:46.3, believed to be the second-fastest final 800 metres of any 1500-meter race in history (behind Abdi Bile's 1:46.0 at the 1987 World Championships). Injuries prevented him from participating in various international competitions from 2007 to 2009.

In addition to his Olympic medal, he won the 1500 m bronze at the 2005 World Championships in Athletics. He has had much success indoors over 1500 m, having won the World Indoor title in 2001 and taken the European Indoor title on three occasions.

Running in the European Cross Country, he came third running an even-paced race with a fast finish to claim the bronze position. The race was over 10 kilometres and was run at a very quick pace throughout. He began to move up in distance from 2009 onwards. He ran in the 5000 m and 10,000 metres at the 2011 World Championships in Athletics, being eliminated in the heats in shorter distance, but coming eleventh over the 10,000 m. He competed at the Lisbon Half Marathon in March 2012 and was the first Portuguese home in fourth place with a personal best of 1:02:40 hours.

Competition record

References

External links

 
 Yahoo Sports profile of Rui Silva
 Association of the Portuguese Olympic Athletes (AAOP)

1977 births
Living people
People from Santarém, Portugal
Portuguese male long-distance runners
Portuguese male middle-distance runners
Athletes (track and field) at the 2000 Summer Olympics
Athletes (track and field) at the 2004 Summer Olympics
Olympic athletes of Portugal
Olympic bronze medalists for Portugal
World Athletics Championships medalists
European Athletics Championships medalists
Medalists at the 2004 Summer Olympics
Olympic bronze medalists in athletics (track and field)
S.L. Benfica athletes
World Athletics Indoor Championships winners
Sportspeople from Santarém District